Carmelina Delfín (died after 1948) was a Cuban composer and pianist. Delfín was born in Havana and in the 1920s performed as a soloist with Ernesto Lecuona in his Ernesto Lecuona Symphonic Orchestra. She played at the 1943 Cuban Liberation Day concert at Carnegie Hall and at numerous other concerts, often performing her own works.

Works
Delfín wrote piano works and lyric-romantic songs including: 
Al recordar tu nombre
12 Composiciones

References

Year of birth uncertain
Year of death uncertain
20th-century classical composers
Cuban music educators
Women classical composers
Cuban composers
20th-century deaths
20th-century women composers